Bossley Park (colloquially known as Little Assyria) is a suburb of Sydney, in the state of New South Wales, Australia. Bossley Park is located 36 kilometres west of the Sydney central business district in the local government area of the City of Fairfield. Bossley Park is part of the Greater Western Sydney region. The suburb is most well known for being an ethnic enclave of Assyrian and other Iraqi ethnic groups living in Sydney.

History
Bossley Park was named after John Brown Bossley (1810–72), an English chemist who purchased a large block of land on Smithfield Road. He named his property Edensor after a village in Derbyshire, England. When the area north of Edensor was subdivided in 1890, it became known as Bossley Park. The public school was built in 1890 and a post office in 1895. After World War II, Bossley Park received many migrants from Italy, who have since played a large role in the local community. Bossley Park and its surrounding suburbs were rural areas until the 1970s, when they were developed into a residential settlement.

Demographics
According to the 2021 census of population, there were 15,492 residents in Bossley Park.

41.4% of people were born in Australia. The most common other countries of birth were Iraq (22.4%), Italy (3.5%), Vietnam (3.8%), Syria (2.8%) and Philippines (1.8%). 29.9% of people only spoke English at home. Other languages spoken at home included Neo-Aramaic (Assyrian/Chaldean) (23.1%), Arabic (10.5%), Italian (4.5%), and Vietnamese (4.4%).

The most common reported ancestries were Assyrian/Chaldean (23.1%), Italian (11.4%), Australians (9.4%), Iraqi (8.6%).

The most common responses for religion in Bossley Park were Catholic (49.3%), Assyrian Apostolic (8.0%), No religion (8.0%), Buddhism (6.4%),  and not stated (5.8%). Christianity was the largest religious group reported overall (78.8%).

Education
Bossley Park has a number of government schools including Bossley Park High School, Bossley Park Public School and Prairievale Public School. There is also the Catholic run Mary Immaculate Primary School.

Places of worship
 Mary Immaculate Catholic Church
 St Thomas the Apostle Chaldean Catholic Church
 St Barnabas' Anglican Church
Bossley Park residents are predominantly Catholic (Latin and Eastern), Assyrian Orthodox and Anglican.

Sport and recreation
The Marconi Stallions football club was founded in the area by Italian immigrants in the 1960s with the Marconi Stadium being built there in 1972 along with ongoing development of the licensed club. The eastern boundary of the suburb is adjacent to a large recreational park Wetherill Park Nature Reserve.

Climate
Like most of Sydney, Bossley Park has a humid subtropical climate (Cfa) with warm to hot summers and cool winters. Most of the precipitation falls in the first four months of the year, with fewer rainfall amount during the middle of the year.

Notable residents
 Mark Schwarzer – Socceroo goalkeeper and World Cup player.

References

Suburbs of Sydney
City of Fairfield